Snipes is a 2001 American drama film directed by Rich Murray and featuring Nelly and Dean Winters.  It is Murray's feature directorial debut.

Cast
Sam Jones III as Erik aka Snipes
Zoe Saldana as Cheryl
Nelly as Prolifik/Clarence
Dean Winters as Bobby Starr
Rashaan Nall as Floyd
Schoolly D as Tony
Joel Garland as Ceaser
Mpho Koaho as Malik
Victor Togunde as Midas
Carlo Alban as Bugsy
Rich Heidelberg as Donnie
Frank Vincent as Johnnie Marandino
Charli Baltimore as Trix
Johnnie Hobbs Jr. as Mr. Triggs

Reception
The film has a 25% rating on Rotten Tomatoes.  Michael Sragow of The Baltimore Sun awarded the film one and a half stars.

References

External links
 
 

2001 films
American drama films
2000s English-language films
Hood films
2000s American films